Santan may refer to:

Places

Arizona, United States 
 Santan, Arizona, a CDP in Pinal County
 San Tan Valley, Arizona, a CDP in Pinal County
 Santan Freeway, a part of Loop 202 in metropolitan Phoenix
 San Tan Mountains Regional Park
 SanTan Village, an outdoor shopping mall in Gilbert

Elsewhere
 Santan, Bobai County (三滩镇), a town in Guangxi, China
 Santan, Isle of Man, a small rural parish
 Santan, Malaysia, a place in Perlis
 Santan (state constituency), represented in the Perlis State Legislative Assembly

Other uses
 Coconut milk, a foodstuff prepared from coconuts
 Ixora coccinea, a flowering plant
 Santan (1959 film), a Bollywood film
 Santan (1999 film), a Bengali language film